Longmire is a surname, of Scottish origin.

Notable people with the surname
Adele Longmire (1918–2008), American actress
Conrad Longmire (1921–2010), American physicist
Ellen Longmire, American physicist and mechanical engineer
James Longmire (1820–1897), American explorer
John Longmire (born 1970), Australian rules footballer
Robert Longmire (born 1944), Australian rules footballer
Tony Longmire (born 1968), American baseball player

Fictional people
Walt Longmire, a fictional character